Zirconium tungstate is the zirconium salt of tungstic acid and has unusual properties. The phase formed at ambient pressure by reaction of ZrO2 and WO3 is a metastable cubic phase, which has negative thermal expansion characteristics, namely it shrinks over a wide range of temperatures when heated. In contrast to most other ceramics exhibiting negative CTE (coefficient of thermal expansion), the CTE of ZrW2O8 is isotropic and has a large negative magnitude (average CTE of -7.2x10−6K−1) over a wide range of temperature (-273 °C to 777 °C). A number of other phases are formed at high pressures.

Cubic phase
Cubic zirconium tungstate (alpha-ZrW2O8), one of the several known phases of zirconium tungstate (ZrW2O8) is perhaps one of the most studied materials to exhibit negative thermal expansion. It has been shown to contract continuously over a previously unprecedented temperature range of 0.3 to 1050 K (at higher temperatures the material decomposes). Since the structure is cubic, as described below, the thermal contraction is isotropic - equal in all directions. There is much ongoing research attempting to elucidate why the material exhibits such dramatic negative thermal expansion.

This phase is thermodynamically unstable at room temperature with respect to the binary oxides ZrO2 and WO3, but may be synthesised by heating stoichiometric quantities of these oxides together and then quenching the material by rapidly cooling it from approximately 900 °C to room temperature.

The structure of cubic zirconium tungstate consists of corner-sharing ZrO6 octahedral and WO4 tetrahedral structural units. Its unusual expansion properties are thought to be due to vibrational modes known as Rigid Unit Modes (RUMs), which involve the coupled rotation of the polyhedral units that make up the structure, and lead to contraction.

Detailed crystal structure

The arrangement of the groups in the structure of cubic ZrW2O8 is analogous to the simple NaCl structure, with ZrO6 octahedra at the Na sites, and W2O8 groups at the Cl sites. The unit cell consists of 44 atoms aligned in a primitive cubic Bravais lattice, with unit cell length 9.15462 Angstroms.

The ZrO6 octahedra are only slightly distorted from a regular conformation, and all oxygen sites in a given octahedron are related by symmetry. The W2O8 unit is made up of two crystallographically distinct WO4 tetrahedra, which are not formally bonded to each other. These two types of tetrahedra differ with respect to the W-O bond lengths and angles. The WO4 tetrahedra are distorted from a regular shape since one oxygen is unconstrained (an atom that is bonded only to the central tungsten (W) atom), and the three other oxygens are each bonded to a zirconium atom (i.e. the corner-sharing of polyhedra).

The structure has P213 space group symmetry at low temperatures. At higher temperatures, a centre of inversion is introduced by the disordering of the orientation of tungstate groups, and the space group above the phase transition temperature (~180C) is Pa.

Octahedra and tetrahedra are linked together by sharing an oxygen atom. In the image, note the corner-touching between octahedra and tetrahedra; these are the location of the shared oxygen. The vertices of the tetrahedra and octahedra represent the oxygen, which are spread about the central zirconium and tungsten. Geometrically, the two shapes can "pivot" around these corner-sharing oxygens, without a distortion of the polyhedra themselves. This pivoting is what is thought to lead to the negative thermal expansion, as in certain low frequency normal modes this leads to the contracting 'RUMs' mentioned above.

High pressure forms

At high pressure, zirconium tungstate undergoes a series of phase transitions, first to an amorphous phase, and then to a U3O8-type phase, in which the zirconium and tungsten atoms are disordered.

Zirconium tungstate-copper system

Through hot-isostatically pressing (HIP) a ZrW2O8-Cu composite (system) can be realized. Work done by C. Verdon and D.C. Dunand in 1997 used similarly sized zirconium tungstate and copper powder in a low carbon steel can coated with Cu, and they were HIPed under 103MPa pressure  for 3 hours at 600 °C. A control experiment was also conducted, with only a heat treatment (i.e., no pressing) for the same powder mixture also under 600 °C for 3 hours in a quartz tube gettered with titanium.

The results from X-ray diffraction (XRD) in the graph in Verdon & Dunand's paper shows expected products. (a) is from the as received zirconium tungstate powder, (b) is the result from the control experiment , and (c) is the ceramic product from the HIP process. Apparently there are new phases formed according to Spectrum (c) with no ZrW2O8 left. While for the control experiment only partial amount of ZrW2O8 was decomposed.

While complex oxides containing Cu, Zr, and W were believed to be created, selected area diffraction (SAD) of the ceramic product has proven the existence of Cu2O as precipitates after reaction. A model consisted of two concurrent processes were surmised (as presented): (b) the decomposition of the ceramic and loss of oxygen under low oxygen partial pressure at high temperature leads to Cu2O formation; (c) copper diffuses into the ceramic and forms new oxides that absorb some oxygen upon cooling.

Since only very few oxides, those of noble metals which are very expensive, are less stable than Cu2O and Cu2O was believed to be more stable than ZrW2O8, kinetic control of the reaction must be taken into account. For example, reducing reaction time and temperature helps alleviate the residual stress caused by different phases of the ceramic during reaction, which could lead to a delamination of the ceramic particles from the matrix and an increase in the CTE.

References

External links
 Strange Shrinking Material

Zirconium(IV) compounds
Tungstates
Inorganic compounds